Roy Samuel Williams  is a British  playwright.

Early life
Williams was born in Fulham and brought up in Notting Hill, the youngest of four siblings in a single-parent home, with his mother working as a nurse after his father moved to the US. Williams decided to work in theatre after being tutored by the writer Don Kinch when he was failing in school and attended some rehearsals in a black theatrical company Kinch ran. After leaving school at the age of 18 Williams did various jobs, including working in McDonald's and in a props warehouse. In 1992, he took a theatre-writing degree at Rose Bruford College and has worked ever since as a writer.

His first full-length play was The No Boys Cricket Club, which premiered in 1996 at Theatre Royal Stratford East. Williams has done work in television, including adapting his own play Fallout, and also co-wrote the script for the 2012 British film Fast Girls.

Awards 

1996. Writers Guild of Great Britain award nomination for Best new writer of the year. For The No Boys Cricket Club.  

1997. First recipient of the Alfred Fagon Award for Starstruck.

1999. Winner of The Joh Whiting Award for most promising playwright for Starstruck

1999. Winner of The Emma Award for best Theatre play, Starstruck. 

2000. Joint winner of the George Devine  Award for most promising playwright for Lift Off. 

2001. Winner of The Of the Most Promising playwright Award at the Evening Standard Theatre Awards for Clubland

2002. Winner of the BAFTA award for best schools drama Offside.

2003. Best play nomination at the Evening Standard Theatre awards for Fallout.

2003. Winner of The Arts Council Decibel Award at the South Bank Awards for Fallout

2005. Best play for young people nomination for Little Sweet Thing for the UK theatre Awards. 

2008. Awarded an OBE by her Majesty The Queen for services to drama. 

2009 Winner at the Screen Nation awards for achievement in screenwriting for Fallout. 

2010. Best play nomination at the Evening Standard Theatre  awards for Sucker Punch

2010. Joint Winner of the Alfred Fagon award for Sucker Punch

2011. Best play nomination art The Olivier awards for Sucker Punch

2011. Winner of The Best Play at the Writers Guild of Great Britain Awards for Sucker Punch

2019. Winner of Diversity in Drama TV production for Soon Gone,  Windrush Chronicle

2019. Winner of Content Innovation   for Best Short firm series Soon Gone: A Windrush Chronicle

2020. Best Short form drama BAFTA TV Awards nomination for Soon Gone: A Windrush Chronicle

2020. Best new  play nomination at the BBC radio drama Awards for  The Likes of Us

2020. RTS nomination for Best writer for Soon Goon: A Windrush Chronicle

2022. Winner of Best Play/musical for Death Of England: Delroy at the Visionary Honours awards

2022. Best Single drama nomination at RTS Awards for Death Of England: Face to Face

2022 Best Single drama nomination at the BAFTA Awards  for Death Of England: Face to Face

2023 Best Single drama nomination at the Broadcast Awards for Death Of England: Face to Face

His plays include:
 No Boys Cricket Club (1996), Theatre Royal Stratford East
 Starstruck (1998)
 Lift Off (1999)
 Local Boy (2000)
 The Gift (2000)
 Souls (2000)
 Clubland (2001), Royal Court Theatre upstairs
 Sing Yer Heart Out For The Lads (2002), National Theatre
 Fallout (2003), Royal Court Theatre downstairs
 Joe Guy (2007)
 Days of Significance (2007)
 Baby Girl (2007), National Theatre, part of the Connections season
 Sucker Punch (2010), Royal Court Theatre downstairs
 A contribution to Sixty-Six Books (multi-authored piece) (2011), Bush Theatre
 The Interrogation  (2012- ), BBC Radio 4
 Advice for the Young at Heart (2013), Theatre Centre
Kingston 14, Theatre Royal Stratford East, 2014. 
 Wildefire, Hampstead Theatre (2014)
 'Soul: Royal & Derngate/Hackney Empire, (2016)
The Firm, Hampstead Theatre, 2017, returning for a second run in 2019. 
 Death of England with Clint Dyer (2020)Death of England: Delroy'' with Clint Dyer (2020)

Faith Hope & Glory  (2020-) BBC Radio 4

Out West (Go Girl) Lyric Theatre Hammersmith, 2021

NW Trilogy (Life Of Riley) Kiln Theatre, 2021

The Fellowship , Hampstead Theatre 2022

Unexpected  Twist  (Based on the children's  novel by Michael Rosen) opens at the Royal & Derngate Theatre Northampton followed by four month UK theatre tour in 2023.

References

1968 births
Living people
20th-century English dramatists and playwrights
21st-century English dramatists and playwrights
Black British writers
Alumni of Rose Bruford College
Officers of the Order of the British Empire
Fellows of the Royal Society of Literature
People from Fulham
English people of Ghanaian descent
English male dramatists and playwrights
21st-century British male writers